There are several rivers named Gravatá River in Brazil:

 Gravatá River (Minas Gerais)
 Gravatá River (Paraíba)
 Gravatá River (Pernambuco), a river of Pernambuco

See also
 Gravataí River, Rio Grande do Sul, Brazil